Speed Cross is a 1980 Italian crime-action film directed by Stelvio Massi.

Cast 
 Fabio Testi: Paolo Corti
 Vittorio Mezzogiorno: Nicola Cellamare
 Daniela Poggi: Inge 
 Jacques Herlin: Fischer  
 José Luis de Vilallonga: Meyer 
 Lia Tanzi: Resi  
 Massimo Ghini

See also        
 List of Italian films of 1980

References

External links

1980 films
1980s crime action films
Films directed by Stelvio Massi
Italian crime action films
1980s Italian films